Anti-synthetase syndrome  is an autoimmune disease associated with interstitial lung disease, arthritis, and myositis.

Signs and symptoms
As a syndrome, this condition is poorly defined. Diagnostic criteria require one or more antisynthetase antibodies (which target tRNA synthetase enzymes), and one or more of the following three clinical features:  interstitial lung disease, inflammatory myopathy, and inflammatory polyarthritis affecting small joints symmetrically. Other supporting features may include fever, Raynaud's phenomenon and "mechanics hands"-thick, cracked skin usually on the palms and radial surfaces of the digits.

The disease, rare as it is, is more prevalent in women than in men. Early diagnosis is difficult, and milder cases may not be detected. Also, interstitial lung disease may be the only manifestation of the disease. Severe disease may develop over time, with intermittent relapses.

Pathogenesis
It is postulated that autoantibodies are formed against aminoacyl-tRNA synthetases. The synthetases may be involved in recruiting antigen-presenting and inflammatory cells to the site of muscle or lung injury. The specific molecular pathway of the process awaits elucidation.

Antisynthetase antibodies
The most common antibody is "Anti-Jo-1" named after John P, a patient with polymyositis and interstitial lung disease detected in 1980. This anti-histidyl tRNA Synthetase antibody is commonly seen in patients with pulmonary manifestations of the syndrome.
The following are other possible antibodies that may be seen in association with antisynthetase syndrome: Anti-PL-7, Anti-PL-12, Anti-EJ, Anti-OJ, Anti-KS, Anti-Zo, Anti-Ha (YRS, Tyr).

Diagnosis
In the presence of suspicious symptoms a number of test are helpful in the diagnosis:
 Anti-tRNA antibody testing
 Electromyography
 Imaging such as High Resolution computed tomography
 Lung biopsy
 Muscle biopsy
 Muscle enzymes are often elevated, i.e. creatine kinase
 Pulmonary function testing
In certain situations, testing of other antibodies, specific imaging (MRI, thoracic high resolution computed tomography), and swallowing evaluation may be needed.

Treatment
Unfortunately, treatment for the anti-synthetase syndrome is limited, and usually involves immunosuppressive drugs such as glucocorticoids. For patients with pulmonary involvement, the most serious complication of this syndrome is pulmonary fibrosis and subsequent pulmonary hypertension.

Additional treatment with azathioprine and/or methotrexate may be required in advanced cases.

Prognosis
Prognosis is largely determined by the extent of pulmonary damage.

References

External links 

Rare syndromes
Syndromes affecting muscles
Rheumatology
Autoimmune diseases
Lung disorders
Syndromes affecting the lung
Syndromes affecting joints